Bauhinia petersiana, the Kalahari white bauhinia, is a species of shrubs from family Fabaceae found in Botswana, Zambia, Democratic Republic of Congo, Lesotho, Mozambique, Angola, Namibia, Tanzania, South Africa, and Zimbabwe.

Ecology
The plant can widstand frost.

Various uses of the plant

Plant as food
The seeds of this plant are considered a delicacy in Botswana, where they are used as nuts. Ground and roasted seeds are often used for coffee. The unripe seeds are not harmful to humans and can be eaten. Botswanans also use the plants seeds for oil.

Craftsmanship
In Congo the bark is used for rope making, while the roots are used to make dye. The plant is harvested by livestock. Its growing as a decorative plant in countries like South Africa, Zimbabwe, and even in the United States.

Medicine
In Zimbabwe the Shona tribe uses the plants roots for medical reasons, such as for treating dysmenorrhoea and female infertility. In South Africa the plants pounded leaves when mixed with salt are used to cure wounds. Also, in majority of countries the macerated roots of the plant are used for treating diarrhoea. Despite its widespread usage, the plant was never domesticated, and therefore was poorly documented.

References

External links
 

petersiana
Plants described in 1861
Flora of Africa
Plants used in traditional African medicine